Vibe, alternatively vibes, is short for vibration. A "vibe" is an emotional reaction to the aura or energy felt to belong to a person, place or thing.

Vibe may also refer to:

People
 DJ Vibe (born 1968), Portuguese DJ
 Lasse Vibe (born 1987), Danish footballer

Media
 Vibe (magazine), a magazine about music artists, actors and other entertainers
 Vibe (comics), a comic book character in the DC Comics universe

Music
 Naver VIBE, a South Korean music streaming service
 Vibe (band), a 2002 Korean musical group
 "Vibe", by the Finnish band The Rasmus from their 1998 album Hell of a Tester
 Vibe (album), a 1997 album by Caught in the Act
 The Vibe (album), a 2007 album by Lexington Bridge
 "Vibe" (Tove Styrke song), from the 2018 album Sway
 "Vibe" (Zhané song), from the 1994 album Pronounced Jah-Nay
 "Vibe On", a 2007 song by Australian singer Dannii Minogue from the album Neon Nights
 "Vibe", a 2020 song by Cookiee Kawaii

Television
 Vibe (talk show), a 1997 American late night talk show
 Vibe (TV channel), a New Zealand television channel on SKY Network Television

Radio
 VIBE FM (Romania), a radio station in Romania
 KCHZ (95-7 The Vibe), a radio station in Ottawa, Kansas
 The Vibe 98.8, a fictional radio station from Grand Theft Auto IV
 CIBK-FM, a radio station in Calgary (2002-2010), now "98.5 Virgin Radio"
 ZFKV-FM, a radio station in the Cayman Islands (2001-2018), now Island FM
 Kiss (UK radio station) (Vibe 101), a radio station in the United Kingdom, now known as Kiss
 Kiss 105-108 (Vibe FM 105-108)), a defunct radio station in East of England
 CHRY-FM (VIBE 105.5), a radio station in Toronto, Ontario

Software
 ViBe, a software method for background extraction in moving images
 Novell Vibe, a web based document management and collaboration system
 VIBE, an educational product and learning management system

Other
 Ozone Vibe, a French paraglider design
 ViBE, a brand name for a Philips GoGear portable media player
Pontiac Vibe, a compact automobile sold by General Motors from 2002 to 2010

See also
 Vibes (disambiguation)